Andrés Correa Valencia (born 29 January 1994) is a Colombian footballer who plays as a left back for La Equidad.

Career
On 10 February 2015, Correa signed with MLS club Seattle Sounders FC. In December 2015, Seattle declined its contract option on Correa.

References

External links

1994 births
Living people
Colombian footballers
Colombian expatriate footballers
Colombia youth international footballers
Colombia under-20 international footballers
Independiente Medellín footballers
Fortaleza C.E.I.F. footballers
Seattle Sounders FC players
Tacoma Defiance players
Boyacá Chicó F.C. footballers
La Equidad footballers
Categoría Primera A players
USL Championship players
Association football defenders
Colombian expatriate sportspeople in the United States
Expatriate soccer players in the United States
People from Envigado
Sportspeople from Antioquia Department